Liebs is a German language patronymic surname derived from Lieb, a nickname for a pleasant or agreeable person. Notable people with the name include:
 Annika Liebs (1979), German swimmer
 Frauke Liebs (1985–2006), German student nurse

See also
 Lieb

References 

German-language surnames
Surnames from nicknames
Patronymic surnames